Libellago is a genus of damselflies in the family Chlorocyphidae. Species in the genus are found mainly in Southeast Asia.

Species
The following are included in BioLib.cz:<ref name=Biolib>[https://www.biolib.cz/en/taxon/id224674/ BioLib.cz: genus "Libellago Selys, 1840 (retrieved 1 October 2021)]</ref>

 Libellago adami Fraser, 1939
 Libellago andamanensis (Fraser, 1924)
 Libellago asclepiades (Ris, 1916)
 Libellago aurantiaca (Selys, 1859)
 Libellago balus Hämäläinen, 2002
 Libellago blanda (Hagen in Selys, 1853)
 Libellago celebensis van Tol, 2007
 Libellago corbeti van der Poorten, 2009
 Libellago daviesi van Tol, 2007
 Libellago dorsocyana Lieftinck, 1937
 Libellago finalis (Hagen in Selys, 1869)
 Libellago greeni (Laidlaw, 1924)
 Libellago hyalina (Selys, 1859)
 Libellago indica (Fraser, 1928)
 Libellago lineata (Burmeister, 1839)
 Libellago manganitu van Tol, 2007
 Libellago naias Lieftinck, 1932
 Libellago orri Dow & Hämäläinen, 2008
 Libellago phaethon (Laidlaw, 1931)
 Libellago rufescens (Selys, 1873)
 Libellago semiopaca (Selys, 1873)
 Libellago stictica (Selys, 1869)
 Libellago stigmatizans (Selys, 1859)
 Libellago sumatrana (Albarda in Selys, 1879)
 Libellago xanthocyana'' (Selys, 1869)

References

Zygoptera genera
Taxa named by Edmond de Sélys Longchamps